The Lunar Discovery and Exploration Program (LDEP) is a program within NASA's Science Mission Directorate.  

The program was established as part of NASA's FY2019 budget, assuming responsibility for the Lunar Reconnaissance Orbiter, along with the Commercial Lunar Payload Services  initiative developing rovers such as VIPER and Lunar Trailblazer.

References

External links

 Official NASA website for Lunar Discovery and Exploration Program

NASA programs